Zondo is a surname. Notable people with the surname include:

Dudu Zondo (born 1994), South African cricketer
Khabo Zondo (born 1961), South African football coach
Khaya Zondo (born 1990), South African cricketer
Raymond Zondo (born 1960), South African judge

See also
 Zondo Commission